27th parallel may refer to:

27th parallel north, a circle of latitude in the Northern Hemisphere
27th parallel south, a circle of latitude in the Southern Hemisphere